Hilary Bell (born 19 July 1966) is an Australian writer of stage, fiction, radio, screen, and theatre.

Early life and education
Hilary bell was born in Stratford-upon-Avon, UK, on 19 July 1966, the daughter of John Bell (founder of the Bell Shakespeare company) and Anna Volska. She grew up in Sydney and  attended high school with fellow Sydney writer Justine Ettler.

She is a graduate of the National Institute of Dramatic Art, the Australian Film, Television and Radio School, and the Juilliard Playwrights' Studio in New York City.

Career
Bell writes for radio, screen, and theatre and also writes fiction.

Recognition and awards
In 1996 she joint won the 1996 Aurealis Award for best young-adult novel with her novel, Mirror, Mirror which is an adaptation of the 1995 television show which Bell was a writer for.

She has also won awards for her work as a playwright; the Philip Parsons Young Playwrights Award, the Jill Blewett's Playwright's Award, the Bug'n'Bub Award, the Eric Kocher Playwrights' Award, the 2007 Inscription Award, and an AWGIE award.

Personal life
Bell's sister is Lucy Bell, and she married Phillip Johnston.

Bibliography

Plays and theatre
Her plays include:
Wolf Lullaby
Fortune
The Anatomy Lesson of Doctor Ruysch
The Falls
Memmie Le Blanc
The Bloody Bride
Perfect Stranger
A Pocket Full of Hula Dreams
"Ugly Beauty"
"Connectivity"

Other theatre credits include:
Mrs. Satan (opera)
The Wedding Song (musical)
Talk Show (song cycle)
Faust (libretto to Phillip Johnston's score)

Television
Television credits include:
Echo Point (1995, writer)
Mirror, Mirror (1995, writer)
Mirror, Mirror (1996), novelised from the TV series

Children's books
The following books were illustrated by Antonia Pesenti
 Alphabetical Sydney (2013)
 Numerical Sydney (2015)
 Summer Time (2019)

References

External links

Living people
1966 births
Helpmann Award winners
National Institute of Dramatic Art alumni
Australian women dramatists and playwrights
Place of birth missing (living people)
20th-century Australian dramatists and playwrights
21st-century Australian dramatists and playwrights
20th-century Australian women writers
21st-century Australian women writers